Paolo Teutonico (1587–1651) was a Roman Catholic prelate who served as Archbishop of Manfredonia (1649–1651).

Biography
Paolo Teutonico was born in 1587 in Nola, Italy.
On 12 Apr 1649, he was appointed during the papacy of Pope Urban VIII as Archbishop of Manfredonia.
On 18 Apr 1649, he was consecrated bishop by Pier Luigi Carafa (seniore), Cardinal-Priest of Santi Silvestro e Martino ai Monti, with Ranuccio Scotti Douglas, Bishop of Borgo San Donnino, and Enea di Cesare Spennazzi, Bishop of Ferentino, serving as co-consecrators.
He served as Archbishop of Manfredonia until his death in Nov 1651.

References

External links and additional sources
 (for Chronology of Bishops) 
 (for Chronology of Bishops)  

17th-century Italian Roman Catholic archbishops
Bishops appointed by Pope Urban VIII
1651 deaths
1587 births